The Winchester Model 1886 was a lever-action repeating rifle designed by John Browning to handle some of the more powerful cartridges of the period. Originally chambered in .45-70, .45-90 WCF, and .40-82 WCF, it was later offered in a half dozen other large cartridges, including the .50-110 Winchester. Despite being originally designed for use with black powder, the action was strong enough to make the jump to smokeless powder with only minor modifications, and was subsequently chambered in the smokeless .33 WCF cartridge beginning in 1903.

History
The Model 1886 continued the trend towards chambering heavier rounds, and had an all-new and considerably stronger locking-block action than the toggle-link Model 1876.  It was designed by John Moses Browning, who had a long and profitable relationship with Winchester from the 1880s to the early 1900s. William Mason also contributed, making some improvements to Browning's original design.  In many respects the Model 1886 was a true American express rifle, as it could be chambered in the more powerful black powder cartridges of the day, proving capable of handling not only the .45-70 but also .45-90 and the huge .50-110 Express "buffalo" cartridges. The action was strong enough that a nickel-steel barrel was the only necessary modification needed to work with smokeless powder cartridges, and in 1903 the rifle was chambered for the smokeless high-velocity .33 WCF cartridge.

During the early stages of World War I, the Royal Flying Corps purchased Model 1886 rifles chambered for the .45-90 Sharps cartridge with special incendiary bullets designed to ignite the hydrogen gas in German airships.

In 1935 Winchester introduced a slightly modified M1886 as the Model 71, chambered for the more powerful .348 Winchester cartridge.

Soon after the introduction of the Model 1886, Browning designed a scaled-down version of the 1886 action for smaller dual-use or carbine cartridges, which was issued as the highly successful Winchester Model 1892.

The 1886 was offered, on a custom basis, in the rare 32-Gauge shotshell. These rifles were especially chambered, and barreled for the 32-Gauge shotshell.

The Winchester 1886 played a minor role in the video-game Half-Life 2 , as supporting character Father Grigori uses the rifle as his weapon of choice during a level where the player must traverse an abandoned village.

See also
 Winchester Repeating Arms Company
 Winchester Rifle

References

External links
 Identifying A Winchester 1866

Rifles of the United States
Lever-action rifles
Winchester Repeating Arms Company firearms
Guns of the American West